Tomasz Pochwała (born 7 May 1983) is a Polish ski jumper and Nordic combined competitor. He finished 6th in the team large hill and 40th in the individual normal hill events at the 2002 Winter Olympics in Salt Lake City.

At the 2003 Ski Jumping World Championships in Val di Fiemme, Pochwała finished 39th in the individual normal hill event. He finished 31st in the individual event of the 2002 Ski Flying World Championships in Harrachov.

Pochwała's best individual World Cup result was 15th in a large hill event in Zakopane in 2002. His only ski jumping victory also occurred in Poland in 2004 though it was an FIS Cup event on the individual large hill. Pochwała had an accident in Planica in 2002, when he lost control in the air and crashed heavily onto the slope.

In 2008 Pochwała changed his discipline from ski jumping to Nordic combined and currently competes in the Nordic Combined World Cup. In the 2009–10 season he achieved several points, something which had never been achieved by any Polish Nordic combined skier for 18 years.

He is the cousin of slalom canoeist Marcin Pochwała.

References

External links

Polish male ski jumpers
Olympic ski jumpers of Poland
Ski jumpers at the 2002 Winter Olympics
Polish male Nordic combined skiers
Sportspeople from Zakopane
1983 births
Living people
Universiade medalists in nordic combined
Universiade silver medalists for Poland
Competitors at the 2011 Winter Universiade
21st-century Polish people